Anne Mette Hansen (born 25 August 1994) is a Danish handball player for Győri ETO KC and the Danish national team.

She represented Denmark at the 2013 World Women's Handball Championship in Serbia (where the Danish team won bronze medals), and later championships.

Achievements
EHF Champions League:
Winner: 2018, 2019
European Junior Championship:
Bronze Medalist: 2013
Nemzeti Bajnokság I
Gold Medalist: 2018, 2019, 2022
Magyar Kupa:
Winner: 2018, 2019, 2021

Individual awards 
 All-Star Left Back of the European Junior Championship: 2013
 All-Star Left Back of the EHF Champions League: 2019
 Youth player of the Year in Damehåndboldligaen: 2013/14

References

External links

Danish female handball players
1994 births
Living people
People from Glostrup Municipality
Győri Audi ETO KC players
Expatriate handball players
Danish expatriate sportspeople in Hungary
Sportspeople from the Capital Region of Denmark
21st-century Danish women